Ettore Cella (12 September 1913 – 1 July 2004) was a Swiss actor and film director. He was naturalised as a Swiss citizen in 1930, as his parents had emigrated from Italy. He appeared in 25 films between 1941 and 2004. He starred in the 1976 film The Sudden Loneliness of Konrad Steiner, which was entered into the 26th Berlin International Film Festival.

Selected filmography
 After the Storm (1948)
 People in the Net (1959)
  (1960)
 The Sudden Loneliness of Konrad Steiner (1976)
 The Inventor (1981)
 Lüthi und Blanc (television series, 2000–2001)
  Sternenberg (2004)

References

External links

1913 births
2004 deaths
Swiss male film actors
Swiss film directors
Swiss people of Italian descent
Swiss Roman Catholics
German-language film directors
Male actors from Zürich